Henday Converter Station is an HVDC converter station near Sundance in the Canadian province of Manitoba.

The Henday Converter Station is the northern terminus for Manitoba Hydro's Bipole II high voltage direct current (HVDC) transmission system and was built in 1977.   It is 42 kilometres northeast of the Radisson Converter Station and is close to the Limestone Generating Station.

It was named after Anthony Henday, an eighteenth-century trader who worked for the Hudson's Bay Company.

References

Power stations in Manitoba